John de Grey, 1st Baron Grey de Rotherfield, KG (9 October 1300 – September 1359) was an English soldier and courtier. John was the son and heir of Sir John de Grey of Rotherfield, by Margaret, daughter of William de Odingsells.

John de Grey of Rotherfield was a founding member of the Most Noble Order of the Garter.

By December 1349, John was Lord Steward of the Royal Household of King Edward III. He distinguished himself well in the Scottish and French wars. He was summoned to parliament often from 1338 to 1357, and is regarded as having thus become Baron Grey of Rotherfield.

Family
He married firstly, shortly before 1313, Katherine Fitzalan, daughter and coheir of Bryan FitzAlan, Lord FitzAlan of Bedale, brother-in-law to King John of Scotland, Yorkshire and had a single son and heir:

 Sir John de Grey, 2nd Baron Grey de Rotherfield. He married Maud de Burghersh, daughter of Sir Bartholomew Burghersh the elder, 1st Baron Burghersh.

He married secondly Avice, daughter of John Marmion, Baron of Winteringham. by whom he had the following issue:

 John de Grey aka Marmion, (d.s.p. 1385) m. Elizabeth St. Quintin (b.1341). His full brother's daughter, Elizabeth, was his heiress.
 Sir Robert de Grey aka Marmion, m. Lora St. Quintin (b.1343); their daughter Elizabeth m. Henry FitzHugh, 3rd Baron FitzHugh

References

Garter Knights appointed by Edward III
Medieval English knights
Barons in the Peerage of England
1300 births
1359 deaths
John